Karl Hermann Heinrich Benda (also Carl Benda), (baptised 2 May 1748 – 15 March 1836) was a German violinist and composer of Bohemian origin.

Life 
Karl Benda was the younger of two sons of the violinist and composer Franz Benda. His godparents were the margraves Friedrich Heinrich (Brandenburg-Schwedt) and Karl Friedrich Albrecht von Brandenburg-Schwedt as well as the Russian envoy Hermann Carl von Keyserlingk. Like his sisters Wilhelmine, Maria Carolina, Sophie Anna Henriette, Juliane and his brother Friedrich, he received music lessons from his father Franz Benda. In 1766, Karl was accepted in the Hofkapelle.

As a violin virtuoso, especially in his performance of adagios, Karl Benda closely resembled his father. They were also said to be similar in character, stature and physiognomy. He was also a prized piano teacher; among his students were King Friedrich Wilhelm III as well as his brother Ludwig, who gave him a lifelong patronage. Other students of Karl Benda were Carl Friedrich Rungenhagen, the actor and singer  and the singer Luise Rudorff, whom he saw performing in the Weimarer Hoftheater in 1792, when he was visiting his sisters Wilhelmine and Maria Carolina. Karl Benda was also accompanist at the Royal Opera in Berlin. In 1802, he became successor to his deceased uncle Joseph Benda, who was a concertmaster at the Hofkapelle in Berlin.

Descendants 
In 1777, Karl Benda married a daughter of the war minister Friedrich August Barth, with whom he had a son August Wilhelm Heinrich Ferdinand (1779–1861). On 28 April 1825, while employed as Kammerdirektor for the princes of Thurn und Taxis, he was raised to the nobility by the Bavarian King. Descendants of Wilhelm von Benda's include the MP and landlord Karl Friedrich Wilhelm Robert von Benda (1816–1899), the officer Hans Robert Heinrich von Benda (1856–1919) as well as the officer and conductor Hans Gustav Robert von Benda (1888–1972), who was assigned to write Franz Lorenz's biography Die Musikerfamilie Benda with documents and photos from his private collection.

After the death of his first wife, Karl Benda married the daughter of Freytag, a renowned cloth maker from Potsdam, with whom he had a son Friedrich August Benda (1786–1854). The latter also pursued a career in higher civil service and was a committed patron of music on the board of several societies, including the Sing-Akademie zu Berlin.

See also 
 Benda (surname)
 Benda

Works 
 Concerto in F major for viola, strings and continuo
 Sonata in E-flat major for violin and continuo (dated April 1, 1785)
 Sonata in F major for violin and continuo (dated †February 16, 1785)
 Sechs Adagios für das Pianoforte nebst Bemerkungen über Spiel und Vortrag des Adagio von Carl Benda pensionirtem Königl. Preuß. Kapellmeister

Further reading 
 Ludwig Finscher (ed.): Die Musik in Geschichte und Gegenwart. (MGG). Zweite, neubearbeitete Ausgabe. Personenteil 2: Bag-Bi. Bärenreiter, Kassel 1999, Spalten 1071 und 1074.
 Franz Lorenz: Die Musikerfamilie Benda. Band 1: Franz Benda. Wilhelm de Gruyter, Berlin 1967, S. 94–101.
 Friedrich August Schmidt, Berhardt Friedrich Voigt, Neuer Nekrolog der Deutschen. Band 14, Verlag B. F. Voigt, 1838, S. 259–260. 
 C. F. Von Ledebur: Tonkünstler-Lexicon Berlin's von den ältesten Zeiten bis auf die Gegenwart. Verlag Рипол Классик, 2012, S. 38, 
 Vera Schwarz: Violinspiel und Violinmusik in Geschichte und Gegenwart: Bericht über den Internationalen Kongress am Institut für Aufführungspraxis der Hochschule für Musik und Darstellende Kunst in Graz, vom 25. Juni bis 2. Juli 1972. Universal Edition, 1975, S. 36.

References

External links 
 
 

1748 births
1836 deaths
German violinists
German Classical-period composers